Lepiota kuehneri is a species of fungus belonging to the family Agaricaceae.

References

kuehneri